Francisco Montana and Bryan Shelton were the defending champions, but lost in the quarterfinals to Javier Frana and Leonardo Lavalle.

Frana and Lavalle won the title by defeating Marc-Kevin Goellner and Diego Nargiso 7–5, 6–3 in the final.

Seeds

Draw

Draw

References

External links
 Official results archive (ATP)
 Official results archive (ITF)

Abierto Mexicano Telcel - Doubles